Staog was the first computer virus written for the Linux operating system.  It was discovered in the autumn of 1996, and the vulnerabilities that it exploited were fixed soon after.  It has not been detected in the wild since its initial outbreak.

Staog was able to infect Linux despite its security-oriented design which requires users and programs to log in as root before any drastic operations can be taken. It worked by exploiting some kernel vulnerabilities to stay resident. Then, it would infect executed binaries.

Since it relied on fundamental bugs, software upgrades made systems immune to Staog. This, combined with its shot in the dark method of transmitting itself, ensured that it died off rather quickly.

Staog was written in assembly language by the hacker group VLAD.

See also
Linux malware

References

External links
Staog information on F-Secures Website
Staog Virus: Linux-Kernel Archive

Linux viruses
Assembly language software